Independent Division of Hunan Provincial Military District(1st Formation) was formed in July 1966 from the Public Security Contingent of the Hunan province. The division was composed of three regiments (1st to 3rd) and two independent battalions.

In March 1969 the division (except for its independent battalions) moved to Guangxi and was renamed as Independent Division of Nanning.

In October 1970 the division was renamed as 1st Independent Division of Guangxi Military District.

In January 1976 the division was disbanded.

References
中国各省军区独立师的历史沿革, https://web.archive.org/web/20160918225002/http://www.360doc.com/content/13/1205/20/1164894_334784330.shtml

IG
Military units and formations established in 1966
Military units and formations disestablished in 1976